The Oxford University men's basketball team represents the University of Oxford in BUCS Midlands Division IA and competes in the NBL Division III South West. The team has won 20 National Championships, making it one of the most successful university basketball teams in the United Kingdom. The team is currently coached by Jamie Smith.

Basketball has a long history at Oxford. In 1893, the New York Times reported the earliest record of basketball being played at the university, only two years after the game's invention. The first known men's basketball team was selected in 1921, when it competed against the University of Cambridge in the inaugural Oxford-Cambridge Varsity Basketball Match.

The 1940s 
In 1947, Oxford assembled the first team of the post World War II era in response to an invitation from the Czechoslovakian National Team to play ahead of the 1948 Olympic Games. In January 1948, The Blues embarked on an eight-game tour of Czechoslovakia. The Czechoslovakian National Team beat Oxford 58-32 in the tour's opening game, but Oxford finished the trip with a 4-4 record.

The first post World War II Varsity Game was held on June 11, 1949 at RAF Halton. Oxford dominated their rivals with a 47-11 victory.

The 1950s 
In 1950, the A.B.B.A. selected the Oxford men's basketball team to play the London Latter Day Saints in a "curtain-raiser" match ahead of a Harlem Globetrotters fixture at the Empire Pool and Sports Arena, Wembley. Oxford's association with the Harlem Globetrotters would continue the following three years when the Oxford-Cambridge Inter-varsity Basketball Match was one of many rivalry games played before the Harlem Globetrotters games during their London tour. Oxford won each of those contests with as many as 10,000 fans in attendance.

In 1951, basketball earned the distinction of being a Half-Blue sport at the University of Oxford.

In 1956, a team captained by Fred Seigler that included future U.S. Senators Richard Lugar and Paul Sarbanes won the University's first ever A.B.B.A. National Championship.

The 1960s 
In 1963, the arrival of John Edgar Wideman had a major impact on the upward trajectory of the basketball program. In his first season, Wideman led Oxford to the A.B.B.A. National Championship Semi-Finals where they lost a two-point thriller (74-76) to eventual three-peat national champions London Central YMCA.

In 1964-65, Wideman's Blues advanced to the A.B.B.A. National Championship game against the Aldershot Warriors, the British Army team. The Warriors would win the first meeting 79-63, but this was just the beginning of a fierce rivalry between Oxford and the British Army that would last the rest of the decade.

In 1965, the arrival of four more Rhodes Scholars provided a much welcomed boost to an already talented roster. The incoming class was highlighted by 1965 NCAA Player of the Year Bill Bradley who had just been drafted by the NBA's New York Knicks. The Oxford Blues won the B.U.S.F. National Championship in December 1965 and then went on to win the A.B.B.A. National Championship in March 1966 with a 91-70 rematch victory against the Aldershot Warriors. Wideman was named A.B.B.A National Championship MVP. In 1966, basketball at Oxford was elevated to Full Blue status.

In 1966-67, Oxford University were considered favourites for the A.B.B.A. National Championship and had what Basketball magazine described as "undoubtedly the finest group of players in the country at present". On November 16, 1966, Oxford took on reigning EuroLeague Champions, Simmenthal Milan, in a game that was broadcast live on BBC. 500 fans managed to pack themselves into Iffley Road Sports Centre to witness one of the most exciting games ever to be played at Iffley Road. Milan ended up edging Oxford 69-70 in what was a back-and-forth affair. The Blues retained their B.U.S.F. National Championship, however the team was denied the opportunity to defend their national title when they were disqualified for arriving late to their third-round game against London Central YMCA.

In 1967-68 Oxford claimed a third consecutive B.U.S.F. National Championship with a 71-37 thrashing of Cambridge University in the final held in Birmingham. On March 16, 1968, an enthusiastic crowd of 1,400 fans filled Crystal Palace to watch the A.B.B.A. National Championship game. It was a repeat of the 1966 Final, with the Oxford Blues beating Aldershot Warriors 61-57. Tom Ward was named A.B.B.A National Championship MVP.

The 1970s 
Oxford University missed out on a third A.B.B.A. national title in 1970, losing 67-73 in the championship final against the Liverpool and Bootle Police who were led by legendary player-coach Jimmy Rogers. The following season (1970–71), Oxford suffered a shock early exit from the A.B.B.A. National Championship when they lost 65-67 to Manchester University.

In 1971-72, the arrival of 1970 NBA draft pick, Heyward Dotson, would change Oxford's fortunes. Dotson led the Blues to the 1971 B.U.S.F. National Championship, while also guiding a combined Oxford and Cambridge side, nicknamed "Oxbridge", to the final of the 1972 A.B.B.A. National Championship.

The 1972-73 side maintained its dominance in British university basketball in 1972-73 with a fifth B.U.S.F. National Championship.

The 1990s 
With its large contingent of Americans, the Dark Blues continued to dominate British university basketball throughout the 1990s. In 1989-90, Oxford were runners-up to Loughborough in the B.U.S.F. National Championship and followed this with back-to-back B.U.S.F. National Championships in 1990-91 and 1991–92, defeating Northern Ireland in both finals. In 1992 Oxford also captured the B.S.S.F. (British Students Sports Federation) national title over heavily favored defending champions Doncaster, 102-69, on the latter's home court.

In 1992-93 Oxford successfully defended its B.S.S.F national crown against arch-rival Cambridge. That year, Jodi Evans made international headlines as the first woman to represent Oxford University Men's Basketball team in the annual Varsity Match against Cambridge. Evans played 16 minutes and scored 4 points in the 86-64 loss. Evans, a member of the Canadian Women's National Team, had previously been ruled ineligible to play in any B.S.S.F. men's league or tournament games in a controversial decision by the sport's governing body because she was a woman.

The Blues won the B.U.S.A. National Championship in 1995.

Oxford's success on the hardwood continued through the late 1990s. In 1997-98, the Blues posted a 25-2 season record and a B.U.S.A. Final Four appearance. A 24-1 season followed in 1998-99, with Oxford capturing the B.U.S.A. national championship with a 73-61 win over Loughborough University.

The 2000s 
Following their National Championship in 1999, Oxford University continued their dominance in British university basketball into the new millennium with a further four straight trips to the B.U.S.A. Championship Final in 2000, 2001, 2002, and 2003. The 2000 championship game saw a rematch against Loughborough who they had beaten the previous year. This time Loughborough were the victors. Oxford regained the title in 2001, but couldn't out match back-to-back champions, College of St Mark and St John, in the 2002 and 2003 Finals.

The 2010s 
Oxford began the 2010s with a pair of B.U.C.S. Premier League South Division titles and consecutive appearances in the B.U.C.S. National Championship Final Four where they lost to Leeds Metropolitan University in 2010 and Worcester in 2011. Since 2011, Oxford have failed to advance further than the Super Eights. In 2018, The Blues went winless (0-10) in the Premier League South and were relegated to B.U.C.S. Midlands League Division One. The team continued to struggle in 2018-19, finishing the season 3-7 in league play to finish in the bottom two of the league and demotion to B.U.C.S. Midlands League Division Two.

The 2020s 
The beginning of the 2020s has seen a renaissance in basketball at Oxford University. In 2021-22, The Blues finished the season with a 23-3 overall record, the most wins since 1998-99, and their first 20+ win season in over two decades. The Blues had a perfect 10-0 record in BUCS league play to be crowned BUCS Midlands 2A champions and earn promotion to tier one. They ended the season as winners of the Oxfordshire Basketball Association Cup for the first time since 1970-71.

In July 2022, the Oxford University Blues were invited to join the National Basketball League for the 2022-23 season. This would mark the first time Oxford University has competed in any national league competition since the 1965-66 season when they competed in the Southern Section of the British National League. This is the first time Oxford University has competed in Basketball England's NBL which was established in 1972. Oxford University began their inaugural National Basketball League campaign with a 3-0 record.

Oxford Blues in the NBA 
George Munroe - St. Louis Bombers (1946–47), Boston Celtics (1947-48).

Bill Bradley - New York Knicks (1967-68 to 1976-77).

Heyward Dotson - Phoenix Suns (10th pick in 7th round of 1970 NBA Draft).

Tom McMillen - Buffalo Braves (1975-76 to 1976-77), New York Knicks (1976–77), Atlanta Hawks (1977-78 to 1982-83), Washington Bullets (1983-84 to 1985-86).

Glenn Fine - San Antonio Spurs (15th pick in 10th round of 1979 NBA Draft).

Notable Oxford University Men's Basketball Alumni 
George Rebh - United States Army General

Amos Jordan - United States Army General

Bernard Rogers - United States Army General

Edgar Shannon - President of the University of Virginia

George Munroe - NBA Basketball Player

Robert Massie - American Historian

Dr John Brademas - American Politician and President of New York University

Elliot Levitas - American Politician and Lawyer

Keith Conners - American Psychologist

Richard Lugar - US Senator

Paul Sarbanes - US Senator

Willie Morris - American Writer

Samuel C. O. Holt - Radio and Television Executive

Edwin Yoder - American Writer

Michael Hammond - American Musician

James Trefil - American Physicist

Edward Berman - American born British Social Activist and Community Educator

John Edgar Wideman - American Writer

Bill Bradley - NBA Basketball Player and US Senator

John Ritch - American Diplomat

William McGrew - Evolutionary Primatologist

Bill Clinton - President of the United States

Rick Mann - England National Team Basketball Player

Heyward Dotson - Professional Basketball Player and Lawyer

Willie Bogan - NFL American Football Player

Clayton Christensen - American Academic

Tom McMillen - NBA Basketball Player and American Politician

Robert McCallum Jr. - American lawyer, U.S. Associate Attorney General, 2003 -

Sir Steve Cowley - Theoretical Physicist

William J. Burns - Director of the Central Intelligence Agency, 2021 -

Glenn Fine - Inspector General of the Department of Justice

Mike Hoffman - Hollywood Director

Richard Cordray - 1st Director of the Consumer Financial Protection Bureau

Ben Sherwood - American writer, journalist, and producer

F. King Alexander - President of Oregon State University

James E. K. Hildreth - American Immunologist

Michael T. Benson - President of Coastal Carolina University

Jodi Evans - Canadian Women's National Team Basketball Player

Peter Henry - American Economist

Cory Booker - US Senator

Douglas Wigdor - American Attorney

Philip Ryken - President of Wheaton College

References

External links 
 Official Website

Basketball teams in England
Basketball
Men's basketball